The Bermuda Monetary Authority (the Authority) is the integrated regulator of the financial services sector in Bermuda. It is not a central bank, and does not provide lender of last resort facilities.

Established under the Bermuda Monetary Authority Act 1969, the Authority supervises, regulates and inspects financial institutions operating from within the jurisdiction. It also issues the Bermudian dollar, manages exchange control transactions; assists other authorities in Bermuda with the detection and prevention of financial crime; and advises the Government and public bodies on banking and other financial and monetary matters.

The Authority develops risk-based financial regulations that it applies to the supervision of Bermuda's banks, trust companies, investment businesses, investment funds, fund administrators, money service businesses and insurance companies. It also licenses companies and regulates the Bermuda Stock Exchange.

See also

Bermudian dollar
Economy of Bermuda
Securities commission

External links
Bermuda Monetary Authority

Central banks
Financial regulatory authorities
Economy of Bermuda
Banks of Bermuda
Government agencies established in 1969
1969 establishments in Bermuda